Jia Qing (born November 2, 1986) is a Chinese actress and singer. She is known for her roles in television dramas The Demi-Gods and Semi-Devils, The Deer and the Cauldron, The Wife's Lies and its sister series The Lover's Lies, and God of War, Zhao Yun.

Background
She was born Jia Qing (贾青) in Xi'an, Shaanxi, China. She attended Xie Jin Film & Television Art College of the Shanghai Normal University.

In 2005 at the age 19, she participated the singing contest My Type My Show (我型我秀) and won Leica Cool Performance Award (莱卡酷表现奖). She later formed a Mandopop group JADE with fellow singers Liu Yujia (刘钰佳), Xia Yanyan (夏筠妍), and Duan Xi (段曦) and released their album on the following year in February.

In July 2007, she made her first acting debut in the 2007 television series Liao Zhai 2.

On November 11, 2018, Jia announced on her Weibo account that she had changed her given name, with Qīng 青 changed to Qīng 清 (different characters but same pronunciation).

Filmography

Film

Television series

Discography

Singles

Awards and nominations

External links

References

1986 births
Living people
Chinese film actresses
Chinese television actresses
Mandarin-language singers
21st-century Chinese actresses
Actresses from Shaanxi
21st-century Chinese women singers